Susanne Camelia-Römer, officially Suzy F.C. Camelia-Römer (born 4 January 1959) is a Curaçao politician of the National People's Party (PNP) and a lawyer. She served two times as Prime Minister of the Netherlands Antilles in 25 November 1993 – 28 December 1993 (1st time ad interim) and 14 May 1998 – 8 November 1999 (2nd time). She was also Minister of Justice from 1992–1994 and Minister of National Recovery and Economic Affairs from 1999–2002. As of March 2016 she is the Minister for Traffic, Transport and Urban Planning of Curaçao. She kept this position in the Hensley Koeiman cabinet which was installed on 23 December 2016.

References

1959 births
Curaçao lawyers
Government ministers of Curaçao
Government ministers of the Netherlands Antilles
National People's Party (Curaçao) politicians
Living people
Prime Ministers of the Netherlands Antilles
20th-century women rulers
21st-century Dutch women politicians
21st-century Dutch politicians
Women government ministers of Curaçao
Women government ministers of the Netherlands Antilles
Women prime ministers